Matthew Campbell (born 30 January 1964) is a former Australian rules footballer in the Victorian and Australian Football Leagues (VFL/AFL) and is now a media representative for a sports betting agency.

Football career 
Campbell was recruited from South Australian National Football League (SANFL) club North Adelaide, and made his senior VFL debut with the Brisbane Bears in their inaugural match in 1987. Campbell made a name for himself as a quick wingman, and went on to play 79 games for the club (and kick 28 goals) between 1987 and 1993. His career highlights include being selected as goalkeeper in International Rules Tests against Ireland in 1987 and 1990.

Media career 
Following his retirement from football, Campbell has worked primarily as a television sports commentator, particularly for Australian rules football, first with the Seven Network, then Fox Footy. Originally based in Brisbane, he moved to Melbourne in early 2002. Campbell has also performed as an MC at sporting events, most commonly at boxing matches, including the Anthony Mundine-Darmel Castillo fight on 2 February 2005.

In January 2006, Campbell was a replacement host on SEN 1116's Hungry for Sport program, but the closure of Fox Footy in October 2006 left him without regular TV commentary work. In 2007 he provided occasional commentary for ABC-TV telecasts of the Victorian Football League Match of the Day.

With the sudden death of friend and former colleague Clinton Grybas in early 2008, Campbell joined the Fox Sports regular AFL commentary team.

In the late 2000s he became a spokesman for online Australian sports betting agency Sportsbet.

Matt is now the main spokesman for BetEasy (formerly CrownBet), used on Seven Sport's AFL broadcasts.

References

External links
 

1964 births
Living people
Australian media personalities
Australian rules football commentators
Brisbane Bears players
North Adelaide Football Club players
All-Australians (1953–1988)
Australian rules footballers from South Australia
South Australian State of Origin players
Australia international rules football team players